Apóstol Santiago is a ward (barrio) of Madrid belonging to the district of Hortaleza.

Wards of Madrid
Hortaleza